AXA Tower, also known as 8 Shenton Way and formerly The Treasury and Temasek Tower, is the 16th-tallest skyscraper in the city of Singapore, at , and the tallest cylindrical building in the world. It is currently in the process of demolition.

Background
Built in 1986 for the Singapore government's Ministry of Finance as the Treasury Building, with 52 storeys it at once became one of the most prominent buildings in the city's business district. Singapore's present Prime Minister, Lee Hsien Loong, had his office in the building, while he was Minister for Finance from 2001 to 2004.

The Advertising agency BBDO Worldwide later had its Asia Pacific Headquarters in the building, and the 14th floor housed the Embassy of Belgium.

Architecture
The structure consisted of steel beams cantilevered from a cylindrical concrete core, allowing full 360° views at the perimeter, unobstructed by perimeter columns. The tower housed sixteen double deck elevators supplied by Otis.

Owners 
When the Ministry of Finance relocated to The Treasury on High Street, the building was transferred to Temasek Holdings, a government-owned corporation, and renamed as Temasek Tower. It was later acquired by CapitaLand. In April 2007, when the building was still known as Temasek Tower, CapitaLand sold it to MGP Raffle Pte Ltd, and it was renamed as the AXA Tower.

On 6 May 2020,  Alibaba Group agreed to buy a 50 per cent stake in AXA Tower, valuing the property at S$1.68 billion.

Redevelopment

At the beginning of May 2022, AXA Tower was closed to the public for demolition with all tenants having relocated.

On 7 July 2022, plans were approved by the Urban Redevelopment Authority for a consortium consisting of Alibaba, Perennial Holdings, and local partners, to redevelop the site of the AXA Tower into a new 63-storey building with a height of 1000 feet (305 metres), making the new building the tallest skyscraper ever approved in Singapore. The mixed-use building will be mostly made up of office, hotel, and residential space, with an observation level and some retail space. It is planned to be completed by 2028. The developers have since engaged Skidmore, Owings & Merrill, the firm responsible for the Burj Khalifa in Dubai, to design the new building.

See also
 List of tallest buildings in Singapore
 List of buildings

References

External links

 8 Shenton Way at MGPA

Office buildings completed in 1986
Former skyscrapers
Skyscraper office buildings in Singapore
Downtown Core (Singapore)
Tanjong Pagar
20th-century architecture in Singapore